The Kōbun period  is a chronological timeframe during the Asuka period of Japanese history. The Kōbun period describes a span of years which were considered to have begun in the 1332nd year of the Yamato dynasty.

This periodization is consistent with the short reign of Emperor Kōbun, which is traditionally considered to have been from 672 through 673.

Periodization
The  adoption of the Sexagenary cycle calendar (Jikkan Jūnishi) in Japan is attributed to Empress Suiko in 604; and this Chinese calendar continued in use throughout the Kōbun period.

However, after the reign of Emperor Kotoku, this method of segmenting time was temporarily abandoned or allowed to lapse. This interval continued during the Kōbun period.

Neither Emperor Kōbun's reign nor the Kōbun periodization are included in the list of nengō for this explicit  duration of time. The  was an unofficial nengō during the reign of Emperor Kōbun after Hakuchi and before Suchō.  The duration of this discrete non-nengō timespan lasted for about two years.

In the post-Taika or pre-Taihō chronology, the first year of Emperor Kōbun's reign (弘文天皇元年 or 弘文天皇1年) is also construed as the first year of the Kōbun period (弘文1年).

Non-nengō period
Non-nengō periods in the pre-Taihō calendar were published in 1880 by William Bramsen. These were refined in 1952 by Paul Tsuchihashi in Japanese Chronological Tables from 601 to 1872.

The pre-Tahiō calendar included two non-nengō gaps or intervals in the chronological series:
Taika, August 645–February 650.
Hakuchi, February 650–December 654.
Non-nengō dating systems
Shuchō, July–September 686.
Non-nengō dating systems
Taihō, March 701–May 704.
Nengō were not promulgated (or were allowed to lapse) during the gap years between Hakuchi and Shuchō, and in another gap between Shuchō and Taihō.

Events of the Kōbun period
 672 (Kōbun 1):  Emperor Tenji dies; and his son, Prince Ō-ama (later to become Emperor Tenmu), declines to receive the succession (senso).  Shortly thereafter, his older brother, Ō-tomo (posthumously known as Emperor Kōbun after 1870), formally accedes to the throne (sokui).
 672 (Kōbun 1): A new period is marked by the beginning of the reign of Emperor Kōbun; but this posthoumus name was created retroactively in 1870, and Meiji scholars did not determine retroactively that a new nengō should have commenced with the beginning of Kōbun's accession.

See also
 Regnal name
 Jinshin War
 List of Japanese era names

Notes

References
 Bramsen, William. (1880). Japanese Chronological Tables: Showing the Date, According to the Julian or Gregorian Calendar, of the First Day of Each Japanese Month, from Tai-kwa 1st year to Mei-ji 6th year (645 to 1873): with an Introductory Essay on Japanese Chronology and Calendars. Tokyo: Seishi Bunsha. OCLC 35728014
 Brown, Delmer M. and Ichirō Ishida, eds. (1979).  Gukanshō: The Future and the Past. Berkeley: University of California Press. ;  OCLC 251325323
 Murray, David. (1894). The Story of Japan. New York, G.P. Putnam's Sons.  OCLC 1016340
 Nussbaum, Louis-Frédéric and Käthe Roth. (2005).  Japan encyclopedia. Cambridge: Harvard University Press. ;  OCLC 58053128
 Ponsonby-Fane, Richard Arthur Brabazon. (1959).  The Imperial House of Japan. Kyoto: Ponsonby Memorial Society. OCLC 194887
 Titsingh, Isaac. (1834). Nihon Ōdai Ichiran; ou,  Annales des empereurs du Japon.  Paris: Royal Asiatic Society, Oriental Translation Fund of Great Britain and Ireland. OCLC 5850691
 Tsuchihashi, Paul Yashita, S.J. (1952). .  Tokyo: Sophia University. OCLC 001291275
 Varley, H. Paul. (1980). A Chronicle of Gods and Sovereigns: Jinnō Shōtōki of Kitabatake Chikafusa. New York: Columbia University Press.  ;  OCLC 6042764
 Zöllner, Reinhard. (2003). Japanische Zeitrechnung: ein Handbuch. Munich: Iudicium Verlag. ;  OCLC 249297777

External links
 National Diet Library, "The Japanese Calendar" -- historical overview plus illustrative images from library's collection

Japanese eras
7th century in Japan
672 beginnings
673 endings